Kitila Alexander Kanyama Mkumbo is a Tanzanian politician and an academic professor.  

He is a founder and director of Maarifa Research and Training Associates, a not-for-profit non-government institution that engages in provision of research, consultancy and training services in a wide range of areas in education and social sciences. As a director of this institute, he leads a team of seven researchers and consultants. He is also an adjunct professor at the Tumaini University Dar es Salaam College, where he is engaged in teaching and research on parttime basis.
In politics and public service, Mkumbo is Member of Parliament for Ubungo Constituency in Dar es Salaam (Tanzania) representing over 750,000 people. Kitila Mkumbo previously served as Minister of Industry and Trade of the United Republic of Tanzania and Minister of State in the President’s Office responsible for investment portfolio. 
Before he joined politics as Member of Parliament in 2020, Mkumbo served as Permanent Secretary of the Ministry of Water for the Government of the United Republic of Tanzania. As permanent secretary, he was the chief executive officer of the ministry with the responsibility to ensure that the ministry delivers the national water vision, namely: to have a water-secure country, where people have sustainable access to sufficient quantity and quality of water to meet human, economic and environmental needs. In implementing this vision, during his tenure, Mkumbo oversaw the improvement of water supply coverage in rural Tanzania from 47% in 2015 to 70.1% as of June 2020, and from 74% in urban areas in 2015 to 84% as of June 2020. 
Prior to being appointed as permanent secretary, Mkumbo was associate professor in psychology and education at the University of Dar es Salaam, Tanzania, having served as academic in this university since 2003. He holds a PhD in psychology from the University of Southampton, UK; Master of Applied Social Psychology and BSc (education) from the University of Dar es Salaam, Tanzania. Kitila Mkumbo has published widely in peer-reviewed journal articles and made dozens of presentations at international academic conferences. He has supervised 31 postgraduate students, with 24 master-level candidates and 7 PhD candidates.

References

Living people
1971 births
Tanzanian educators
Chama Cha Mapinduzi MPs
Tanzanian MPs 2020–2025
Chama Cha Mapinduzi politicians
Government ministers of Tanzania
Pugu Secondary School alumni
University of Dar es Salaam alumni